Ashley Kristina Holcombe (born February 20, 1987) is an American softball player who plays catcher for the USA national softball team. Holcombe is now in her third year with the Women's National Team.

College 
Holcombe attended the University of Alabama, majoring in marketing. She made 244 career starts at catcher over four years played on the Crimson Tide softball team. She was named second-team All-SEC after the 2008 season when she hit .323 for the season with 12 doubles, five home runs and 21 RBI. She also threw out twenty-six base runners and picked off five.  Holcombe was also named an ESPN.com All American her senior year. She was selected as a candidate for the Lowe's Senior CLASS Award during the 2009 season.

Post-college career 
Holcombe was drafted in the fifth round by the Rockford Thunder of the National Pro Fastpitch softball league. She appeared in 14 games for the Thunder, posting a .121 batting average, 4 hits, 1 RBI, and 1 run. On January 11, 2010, she was again named to the 2010 USA women's national softball team. On January 22, 2010, the NPF's Chicago Bandits announced that they had signed Holcombe to a contract for the 2010 season. On July 28, 2011, Samford University head softball coach Mandy Burford announced that Holcombe had been named an assistant coach on the Samford softball coaching staff.

Personal life
On October 9, 2010, Holcombe and her fiancé, Clifford Bell, exchanged marriage vows in a private ceremony at the Higdon House in Greensboro, Georgia.

Career statistics

References

External links
 
 
 Ashley Holcombe: Chicago Bandits Player Bio
 Ashley Holcombe: Rockford Thunder Player Bio
 Ashley Holcombe: USA Softball Player Bio
 Ashley Holcombe Bell: Samford Coaching Profile

1987 births
Living people
Alabama Crimson Tide softball players
Chicago Bandits players
Rockford Thunder players
Samford University people
Pan American Games gold medalists for the United States
Pan American Games medalists in softball
Softball players at the 2011 Pan American Games
People from Riverdale, Georgia
People from Fayetteville, Georgia
Softball players from Georgia (U.S. state)
Sportspeople from the Atlanta metropolitan area
Medalists at the 2011 Pan American Games